Marc Fernández Usón (born July 23, 1987 in El Masnou, Catalonia) is a Spanish former basketball player, playing the small forward position. He played for Valencia BC in Liga ACB.

External links

ACB Profile
FIBA Profile

1987 births
Living people
Basketball players from Catalonia
CB Girona players
FC Barcelona Bàsquet players
Liga ACB players
Menorca Bàsquet players
Spanish men's basketball players
Valencia Basket players
Small forwards